Far Western University is a university in Nepal, located in Mahendranagar, Kanchanpur. It was established on August 2010 (2067 BS) by the Act of the Constituent Assembly by the Government of Nepal. It came into operation in 2011, after the appointment of the university officials. Prime Minister of Nepal serves as the Chancellor of the university.

Constituent campuses
Gokuleshwor Multiple Campus, Darchula
Kailali Multiple Campus

Faculties and programmes
Faculty of Agriculture Science (B.Sc. Ag)
 Faculty of Management (BBA, BBS, MBA)
 Faculty of Education (B.Ed., M.Phil)
 Faculty of Humanities and Social Sciences ( BA, BSW)
 Faculty of Science and Technology (B.Sc., B Ed.CSIT, B.Sc. CSIT)
 Faculty of Law (BA LLB)
 Faculty of Engineering (BE Civil, BE Computer, BE Architecture (Proposed), ME Structural Engineering (Proposed))

References

Universities and colleges in Nepal
Buildings and structures in Kanchanpur District
2010 establishments in Nepal
Educational institutions established in 2010